Sport Vereniging De Meteoor are a Dutch amateur  football (soccer) club from the Amsterdam borough of Amsterdam-Noord in the neighborhood Tuindorp Oostzaan, founded in 1923. The club hold a Sunday team competing in the Derde Klasse.

References

External links 
 SV De Meteoor Official website

Football clubs in the Netherlands
Association football clubs established in 1923
Football clubs in Amsterdam
1923 establishments in the Netherlands